Lejeanne Marais (born 25 October 1989) is a South African former competitive figure skater. She is a five-time (2008, 2009, 2011, 2012, 2013) South African national champion and competed in the free skate at six Four Continents Championships. She was coached by her mother, Susan Marais, and Laurent Depouilly, in Cape Town. She studied architecture at the Tshwane University of Technology in Pretoria, South Africa.

Programs

Results

References

External links 

 

1989 births
Living people
People from Benoni
White South African people
South African female single skaters
Tshwane University of Technology alumni
Sportspeople from Gauteng
Competitors at the 2015 Winter Universiade
Competitors at the 2011 Winter Universiade